Jay Brian Fiedler (born December 29, 1971) is a former American football quarterback in the National Football League (NFL). He played 76 games at quarterback in the NFL, starting 60, and threw 69 touchdowns. He was inducted into the National Jewish Museum Sports Hall of Fame in 2002.

Early life and high school years
Fiedler is Jewish, and was born to a Jewish family on Long Island in Oceanside, New York.  He is a distant relative of Arthur Fiedler, the long-time conductor of the Boston Pops Orchestra.

Fiedler attended Oceanside High School in Oceanside, New York, and won varsity letters as a quarterback in football, a point guard in basketball, and as a decathlete in track and field.

College career
He is an alumnus of Dartmouth College, where he was a member of Beta Theta Pi fraternity. In football, Fiedler set school records for touchdown passes (58), passing yards (6,684) and total offense (7,249 yards).

Fiedler was named Co-Offensive Player of the Game in the 1994 East-West Shrine Game.  He received a Scholar-Athlete Award from the National Football Foundation and Hall of Fame, the Nils V. "Swede" Nelson Award for sportsmanship, and received his degree in mechanical engineering. He was named the MVP for the 1994 Ivy Bowl in Japan.

Professional career
Fiedler had stints with the Philadelphia Eagles (1994–95), Minnesota Vikings (1998), and Jacksonville Jaguars (1999) before finding steady work with the Dolphins (2000–04) beginning in 2000. In between his time with the Eagles and Vikings, Fiedler served as a receivers coach at Hofstra University in 1997 before being signed as a free agent by Minnesota in 1998.

Fiedler signed a three-year, $3.8 million contract with the Miami Dolphins in 2000, replacing Dan Marino as starter for the team. He beat out Damon Huard for the starting role.

Fiedler's stint with the Dolphins featured three 10+ win seasons in four years, two 11–5 seasons in 2000 and 2001, an AFC East title, and two postseason appearances including a victory for the Miami Dolphins. During these years, the Dolphins' offense lagged notably behind its defense, which featured perennial Pro Bowlers in linebacker Zach Thomas, cornerbacks Sam Madison and Patrick Surtain, and Pro Football Hall of Fame defensive end Jason Taylor. He is the last Miami Dolphins quarterback to win a playoff game, winning the 2000 AFC wild card game, 23–17 in overtime, versus the Indianapolis Colts on December 30, 2000, at Pro Player Stadium. In 2004, Fiedler was benched after week 1 in favor of A.J. Feeley, but was brought back as starter after Feeley struggled.

Fiedler signed with the Jets as an unrestricted free agent on March 11, 2005, as a backup quarterback to Chad Pennington. On September 25, 2005, in a game against his former team the Jaguars, Fiedler was pressed into action when Pennington suffered what would prove to be a season-ending rotator cuff tear. Fiedler would himself suffer a severe shoulder injury during the game and was also sidelined for the remainder of the 2005 season.

Fiedler was released by the Jets on February 22, 2006. On June 29, he signed with the Tampa Bay Buccaneers to serve as backup to Chris Simms. Fiedler was released during the first wave of cuts in August due to a nagging shoulder issue that made him unable to practice.

Fiedler sat out 2006 rehabilitating his throwing shoulder following his release from Tampa Bay.

Fiedler was set to work out for the Falcons in April 2007, according to his agent Bryan Levy. In addition, the Giants considered signing him but eventually signed Anthony Wright instead.

He last played in 2008 due to his shoulder injuries.

Fiedler played in 76 games with 60 starts and is a 58.7 percent career passer. He threw for 69 touchdowns and 66 interceptions in his career, with 11,844 passing yards.

NFL career statistics

Outside the NFL
In 2007, Fiedler and Demetrius Ford became co-owners of the CBA basketball expansion team East Kentucky Miners based in Pikeville, Kentucky.

In 2008, Fiedler made his pro volleyball debut.

Fiedler, who is Jewish, was inducted into the National Jewish Museum Sports Hall of Fame in 2002.  At the time of his induction, Fiedler mentioned how strong he is in his faith.  Fiedler was one of two active NFL players inducted into the Hall that year, the other being then-Pittsburgh Steelers punter Josh Miller. ESPN personality Chris Berman would also occasionally allude to Fiedler's faith by referring to him as Fiedler on the Roof after performing well in games, even going far as to start singing "If I Were a Rich Man" during highlights.

Fiedler currently owns and operates The Sports Academy at Brookwood Camps and the Prime Time Sports Camps along with his brother Scott. Brookwood is a summer sleep away camp that has been family owned by the Fiedlers since 1986. Prime Time Sports Camps operates various sports camps and clinics throughout the year with Fiedler operating all of the football sessions.

Fiedler spent four months training Rutgers QB Gary Nova for the NFL.

See also
List of select Jewish football players

References

External links
NFL statistics

1971 births
Living people
Amsterdam Admirals players
Dartmouth Big Green football players
Jacksonville Jaguars players
Jewish American sportspeople
Miami Dolphins players
Minnesota Vikings players
American football quarterbacks
New York Jets players
People from Oceanside, New York
Philadelphia Eagles players
Players of American football from New York (state)
21st-century American Jews